The 2017 Lafayette Leopards football team represented Lafayette College in the 2017 NCAA Division I FCS football season. The Leopards were led by first-year head coach John Garrett and played their home games at Fisher Stadium. They were a member of the Patriot League.  They finished the season 3–8, 3–3 in Patriot League play to finish in a three-way tie for third place.

Schedule
The 2017 schedule consists of five home and six away games. The Leopards will host Patriot League foes Sacred Heart, Fordham, Bucknell, and Colgate, and will travel to Holy Cross, Georgetown, and Lehigh for the 153rd meeting of The Rivalry.

In 2017, Lafayette's non-conference opponents will be Monmouth of the Big South Conference, Villanova of the Colonial Athletic Association, and Princeton and Harvard of the Ivy League.

References

Lafayette
Lafayette Leopards football seasons
Lafayette Leopards football